Kamkalykol is a lake in the Moiynkum District, Jambyl Region, Kazakhstan.

The ruins of ghost town Kishi Kamkaly, abandoned in 2019, lie by the northern end of the lake. The lake water is used for watering livestock grazing in the surrounding area.

Geography
Kamkalykol lies in the lower Shu river basin to the north of the river channel. Kamkalykol stretches roughly from northwest to southeast for almost . To the south it is bound by the Shu floodplain.

Kamkalykol freezes in mid November and thaws in March. On average the water level rises right after the melting of the snows in the spring and decreases in the summer.

Flora  
The lake is swampy, especially in its southern part. There is abundant reed growth by the lakeshore and in shallow areas.

See also
List of lakes of Kazakhstan

References

External links

Подземные моря Уфы Ахмедсафина
Chu-Talas, Kazakhstan
Об утверждении перечня объектов государственного природно-заповедного фонда республиканского значения (On approval of the list of objects of the state natural reserve fund of republican significance)

Lakes of Kazakhstan
Jambyl Region
Chu (river)